Зарафшон (formerly Munavvarsho Shogadoev) is a jamoat in Tajikistan. It is located in Tojikobod District, one of the Districts of Republican Subordination. The jamoat has a total population of 5,162 (2015). Villages: Shing, Zafarobod (the seat), Guliston, Safedoron, Shahriston.

References

Populated places in Districts of Republican Subordination
Jamoats of Tajikistan